Route 13 is a  two-lane uncontrolled access secondary highway traversing the central portion of Prince Edward Island, Canada in a more or less north–south direction between Crapaud and Cavendish. It passes through a mainly rural area of Prince Edward Island. A portion of Route 13 (south of Hunter River) is commonly called the "Hopalong Road."  

There is an important intersection with Route 2 at Hunter River. There are minor intersections with Route 225 in the rural community of Hopedale (where it is called Hopedale Road), Route 246 in Kellys Cross and Route 224 in New Glasgow. Route 13 intersects with Route 235 (Kingston Road) east of Brookvale. In Cavendish it intersects with Route 6 and terminates at Gulf Shore Road inside Prince Edward Island National Park.

Major intersections

References 

013
013